Guarda in cielo is the third street album by the Italian rapper Bassi Maestro, released on 10 June 2013.

Track listing

Link 

2013 albums
Bassi Maestro albums